"Le Déserteur" (The Deserter) is a famous anti-war song written by the French poet and musician Boris Vian. It was first performed on the day of the decisive French defeat in the First Indochina War on May 7, 1954.

It was sung by Marcel Mouloudji on that day in concert, and he recorded it a week later. Its sale and broadcast were however forbidden by the French national radio committee until 1962. It was later translated into English, German (1959 by Gerd Semmer), Italian (by Luigi Tenco, Ornella Vanoni and Ivano Fossati), Spanish, Swedish ("Jag står här på ett torg" and "Desertören", both by Lars Forssell), Dutch ("De deserteur" by Peter Blanker), Polish ("Dezerter" by Wojciech Młynarski), Welsh ("Y FFoadur" by Huw Jones), Catalan, Danish, and many other languages. 
The song was recorded in French by Peter, Paul & Mary in 1966 and by Esther & Abi Ofarim for their album 2 In 3 in 1967. The song was one of four Vian songs translated into English and released as a 1983 EP by New Zealand musician Bill Direen, using the pseudonym "Feast of Frogs" (the other songs were "Snob", "I Drink", and "Hurt Me Johnny").
In the United States, Joan Baez sang it during the Vietnam War.

The song is in the form of a letter to the French president from a man explaining his reasons for refusing the call to arms and becoming a deserter.

In the late 1970s, the song was covered by nuclear protesters in Brittany, as a direct apostrophe to the fierce pro-nuclear French president Giscard d'Estaing in the Plogoff struggle.

A stanza of the song appears in Thomas Pynchon's novel V.

Several parts of the song were altered by Boris Vian at the request of and in collaboration with Michel Mouloudji, who was the only singer willing to record it. The biggest change is in the last stanza. In the original version, the deserter has a weapon and intends to defend himself against the forces of law if they pursue him. In the version of Mouloudji (used by many subsequent artists) he promises to be unarmed and be ready to die if pursued. The following is the altered French stanza and its English translation:

Si vous me poursuivez,
Prévenez vos gendarmes
Que je n'aurai pas d'armes
Et qu'ils pourront tirer.

If you pursue me,
Warn your policemen,
That I won't be carrying a weapon,
and that they can shoot me.

The resulting version, in spite of its pacifist leaning, was banned from 1954 to 1962 from public broadcast.

See also
List of anti-war songs

References

External links 
 Le Déserteur in 45 languages, with the complete history of the song in French, Italian and English, from website Chansons Contre la Guerre (CCG/AWS)
"Le Deserteur (Monsieur le President)" performed by Esther & Abi Ofarim

Songs about soldiers
Songs about letters (message)
Songs about the military
1954 songs
Anti-war songs
French songs
Desertion
Music controversies
Works by Boris Vian
Peter, Paul and Mary songs
Esther & Abi Ofarim songs